John M. Young MC (1891 – 20 November 1947) was a Scottish amateur footballer who played in the Scottish League for Motherwell and Partick Thistle as an outside right. He also played cricket for Clydesdale.

Personal life 
Young was the younger brother of footballer Bob Young. Young studied medicine at the University of Glasgow Medical School and graduated with a MB ChB in 1914. After the outbreak of the First World War in 1914, he enlisted in the Royal Army Medical Corps and became medical officer for the 15th Battalion of the Highland Light Infantry. In 1917, Young was awarded the Military Cross for "saving many lives by establishing a first aid post well forward in the support line and tending to the wounded while under fire" during the Battle of the Somme on 3 July 1916. At the time of the award, he was holding the rank of temporary major. Young was seriously wounded in February 1917 and had a leg amputated. In 1920, Young qualified as a Doctor of Public Health and became a fellow of the Royal Faculty of Physicians and Surgeons of Glasgow in 1926. He became a chief school medical officer for Glasgow, was a member of the Scottish Council for Research in Education and served as honorary secretary of the Association of School Medical Officers.

Career statistics

Honours 
Queen's Park Strollers

 Scottish Amateur Cup: 1911–12

References

1891 births
1947 deaths
Scottish footballers
Association football outside forwards
Scottish Football League players
Queen's Park F.C. players
British Army personnel of World War I
Footballers from Perth and Kinross
Motherwell F.C. players
Partick Thistle F.C. players
King's Park F.C. players
Royal Army Medical Corps officers
Scottish amputees
Recipients of the Military Cross
Alumni of the University of Glasgow Medical School
Scottish cricketers
Clydesdale CC players
Association footballers with limb difference
Scottish disabled sportspeople